This article is about 1991-1995 seasons of LG Cheetahs.

Seasons Statistics

All competitions records 
※ 1993 season had PSO and blows results are that PSO results are counted by drawn.
※ A: Adidas Cup

Season Summary

1991 season summary

1992 season summary

1993 season summary

1994 season summary

1995 season summary

Kits

First Kit

Second Kit

Transfers

1991 season

In

Rookie Draft

Out

Loan & Military service

1992 season

In

Rookie Draft

Out

Loan & Military service

1993 season

In

Rookie Draft

Out

Loan & Military service

1994 season

In

Rookie Draft

Out

Loan & Military service

In

Rookie Draft

Out

Loan & Military service

See also
 FC Seoul

References

 FC Seoul Matchday Magazines  
 The K League history at K League official website

External links
 FC Seoul Official Website 

1991–1995